Pura Vida, meaning "pure life" in Spanish, may refer to the following:

A phrase encapsulating the culture of Costa Rica
Pura Vida (film), a 1956 Mexican film that popularized the phrase
Pura Vida (album), a 2006 album from the band Hamlet
Pura Vida Bracelets, company that sells bracelets from Costa Rica
Pura Vida Coffee, company that sells coffee from Africa and Latin America
Pura Vida Conspiracy, a 2013 album from the band Gogol Bordello
 Pura Vida, original name of the band Carrie

Spanish words and phrases